Theodor Rosebury (London, 10 August 1904—Conway, Massachusetts, 25 November 1976) was a British-born American bacteriologist and author. He has been called the “pre-eminent oral microbiologist of his era” and the “Grandfather of Modern Oral Microbiology”.

Biography
Rosebury became a naturalized U.S. citizen in 1916 and attended the University of Pennsylvania (DDS, 1928). He was chief of the Airborne Infection project at Fort Detrick, Maryland during World War II. He conducted research in Alaska with Leuman Maurice Waugh (1877–1972), a dentist, explorer, and lecturer. He was a professor at Columbia University College of Dental Medicine. He later resided in Chicago. He ended his career as an Emeritus Professor of bacteriology at Washington University in St. Louis. After retirement he dedicated himself to writing, cabinetmaking and music. (He played the flute.) He died at his home in Conway, Massachusetts on 25 November 1976 at the age of 72.

Works
Experimental Air-Borne Infection: Equipment and Methods for the Quantitative Study of Highly Infective Agents... / by T. Rosebury with the co-authorship and assistance of the staff of the laboratories of Camp Detrick, Maryland. Balt., Williams and Wilkins, 1947 bibl., illus.
Theodor Rosebury and Elvin A. Kabat (1947), "Bacterial Warfare: A Critical Analysis of the Available Agents, Their Possible Military Applications, and the Means for Protection Against Them", Journal of Immunology 56, 1, (May 1947): pp 7–96.
Peace or Pestilence? Biological Warfare and How to Avoid It (1949), New York City: McGraw-Hill.
Microorganisms Indigenous to Man (1962), New York: McGraw-Hill Book Company.
Life on Man (1969), New York: The Viking Press.
Microbes and Morals: The Strange Story of Venereal Disease (1971), New York: The Viking Press.

Accolades
Fellow, American Association for the Advancement of Science
Member, International Association for Dental Research
Member, American Society for Microbiology
Member, the Harvey Society
Member, American Public Health Association
Diplomate, American Academy of Microbiology

References

1911 births
1976 deaths
American bacteriologists
University of Pennsylvania School of Dental Medicine alumni
Washington University in St. Louis faculty
People related to biological warfare
Military medicine in the United States
People from Conway, Massachusetts
British emigrants to the United States
Columbia University faculty